The Shuowen tongxun dingsheng is an 18-volume study of the Shuowen Jiezi completed in 1833 by the Qing phonologist Zhu Junsheng (朱駿聲) (1788–1858) and published in 1870.  The bulk of the work is a phonetic study in which the 9000 characters of the Shuowen Jiezi and 7000 additional characters are grouped into 1137 series, each sharing a phonetic element.  These phonetic series were further grouped into 18 Shijing rhyme groups, based on Duan Yucai's dictum that characters sharing a phonetic element belonged in the same rhyme group.  The work thus anticipated the structure of Bernard Karlgren's Grammata Serica Recensa.  The work also includes very detailed notes on rhyming, semantics, and interchangeable characters.

References 
  p. 439.

External links 
 Shuowen tongxun dingsheng at the Internet Archive
 Shuowen tongxun dingsheng at the Chinese Text Project

Chinese dictionaries